Alfred Freiherr von Henikstein (11 August 1810 – 29 January 1882) was the highest ranking Jewish officer in the Austrian army and chief of staff before and during the Austro-Prussian War.

Von Henikstein was born in Oberdöbling near Vienna, the youngest son of the Jewish banker Ritter Joseph von Henikstein. He was baptized as a child and in 1828 entered in the Austrian engineering corps.

In 1829 he became lieutenant, in 1832 first lieutenant and in 1842 captain. In 1835 he married in Verona Santina von Scholl, daughter of the fortress architect Franz von Scholl, the "Austrian Vauban".

In 1848 he fought in Italy before Venice, participating in the construction of Fort San Pietro. He also took part in the Hungarian campaign and became in the same year major in the general staff, and in the following year colonel. With the IV. Corps he occupied Altona. In 1852 he lived in Venice, where his wife died in 1853. In 1854 he became major general, and in 1859 lieutenant general in Tyrol. 

He became chief of staff in 1863. An efficient officer on the corps level, he was promoted above his qualification and in spite of his own initial rejection of the appointment.

In the Austro-Prussian War of 1866 his role as chief of staff was revoked the day before the battle of Königgrätz, although he participated in the battle. After the war he was court-martialed; the process was stopped by the Emperor, but Henikstein had to retire.

Alfred von Henikstein died on 29 January 1882 in Vienna.

Bibliography
 Geoffrey Wawro, The Austro-Prussian War. Austria's war with Prussia and Italy in 1866 (New York 2007),

External links
http://www.heidecker.eu/History/KuK_Main.htm
http://pom.bbaw.de:8080/JDG/browse?id=JRE09591VI&year=1933-34#JBIB091568

1810 births
1882 deaths
Austrian Jews
Barons of Austria
Austrian soldiers